Havaldar Lalak Jan (April 1967 – July 1999) was a soldier of Pakistan Army belonging to Northern Light Infantry regiment. He was Martyred in action during the Kargil war. For his bravery, he was awarded Pakistan's highest military gallantry award, Nishan-e-Haider. Lalak Jan hailed from Yasin Valley, village name Hundur, in Gilgit-Baltistan which is a province of Pakistan.

Early life 
Lalak Jan was born on 1 April 1967 at Yasin, in the Gupis-Yasin District, of Gilgit-Baltistan. After completing his education, he joined the Pakistan Army on 10 December 1984 and eventually rose up to rank of Havaldar.

Death 
Lalak Jan was serving in the Northern Light Infantry (NLI) when the Kargil War started. He volunteered to be deployed on the front lines in May 1999. In late 1999, his post came under a number of attacks from the Indian Army but he successfully managed to repulse them. He was killed on 7 July 1999 after he sustained serious injuries from the heavy mortar pounding on his positions by the Indian Army.

According to the official statement:

He was serving in Northern Light Infantry Regiment when skirmishes broke out in Kargil in 1999. Havildar Lalak Jan of the Northern Light Infantry Regiment fought from the forefront to thwart heavy Indian attacks. He volunteered himself to be deployed on the front positions located at the jagged peak in May 1999. Havildar Lalak Jan repulsed back many aggressive ventures by the enemy and imposed colossal losses on them. On 7 July 1999, Havildar Lalak Jan sustained serious injuries as enemies pounded the area with heavy mortar shells. But despite being injured, he retained his position and frustrated the Indian assault. Due to severe injuries, he embraced martyrdom and was graciously awarded the Nishan-e-Haider for his bravery and his will to attack and defeat the enemy at all costs.

Buried

Lalak Jan was buried in his native town in Hundur, Yasin Valley, in the Gupis-Yasin District, of Gilgit-Baltistan. Every year officials from Pakistani Government, Pakistan Armed Forces and other locals visit the tomb to offer prayer and lay floral wreath.

Awards and decorations
The Government of Pakistan awarded him Nishan-e-Haider, the country's highest award for extraordinary gallantry.

References

1967 births
1999 deaths
Recipients of Nishan-e-Haider
People from Gilgit-Baltistan
People of the Kargil War
Pakistani military personnel killed in action